The genus Lactarius has about 583 members worldwide. The type species is Lactarius torminosus. Probably the best known and most widely eaten is Lactarius deliciosus. A large number of species were split into the Lactifluus genus based on molecular phylogenetic evidence.

Key

Species

English names

References
Footnotes

Citations

Sources

 

 

Lactarius